Lawrie is a (patronymic or paternal) family name of Scottish origin which means "crafty." Variants of which include: Laurie, Lorrie, Larry, Laury, Lawry and Lowrie. It is also used as a given name, often a short form (hypocorism) of Lawrence.

Surname
 Allan Lawrie (1886–1915), Scottish footballer
 Andy Lawrie (born 1978), Scottish footballer
 Bobby Lawrie (born 1947), Scottish footballer
 Brett Lawrie (born 1990), Canadian baseball player
 Corey Lawrie (born 1980), New Zealand rugby league player
 Deborah Lawrie (born 1953), Australian aviator
 Ellis Lawrie (1907–1978), Australian politician
 Gawen Lawrie (fl. 1675–1687), American politician
 Gerald Lawrie, (born 1945), Australian-born American surgeon
 James Lawrie (born 1990), Northern Irish footballer
 John Lawrie (1875–1952), Scottish-born Canadian politician
 Lee Lawrie (1877–1963), American sculptor
 Margaret Lawrie (1917–2003), anthropologist of the Torres Strait
 Nate Lawrie (born 1981), American National Football League player
 Paul Lawrie (born 1969), Scottish golfer
 Peter Lawrie (born 1974), Irish golfer

Given name
 Lawrie Barratt (1927–2012), founder of Barratt Developments, one of the largest housebuilders in the United Kingdom
 Lawrie Knight (born 1949), New Zealand former rugby union player
 Lawrie McMenemy (born 1936), English former football manager
 Lawrie Minson (born 1958), Australian musician, guitarist and songwriter
 Lawrie Quinn (born 1956), British politician
 Lawrie Sanchez (born 1959), Northern Irish football manager and former player

References

See also
 Lawry, a surname

Surnames of Scottish origin
English-language masculine given names
Hypocorisms